The Seventh Night: Unplugged is a compilation album released by Gackt on May 26, 2004. It contains acoustic arrangements of previously released songs and complements The Sixth Day, a single collection released three months earlier. The unplugged theme of The Seventh Night would be continued by Gackt's subsequent album, Love Letter.

Release
The album was released on May 26, 2004, by Nippon Crown. In the initial counting week of June it reached number five on the Oricon chart, with sales of 42,105 copies. In the upcoming week, it was at number twelve respectively, with sales of 13,518. It charted for 8 weeks, and sold over 100,000 copies, certified Gold by RIAJ.

Track listing

References

Gackt compilation albums
2004 compilation albums